Joel Melchor Sánchez Alegría (born 11 June 1989) is a Peruvian footballer who plays as an attacking midfielder for UTC.

Club career
Sánchez made his professional debut with Atlético Universidad on 4 February 2007 in the First Round of the 2007 Torneo Descentralizado season at home against Universitario de Deportes. Manager Roberto Arrelucea allowed him to enter the match in the 65th minute for Luis Collantes, but the match finished in a 2–1 loss for his side.

Joel made his league debut for Total Chalaco on 2 February 2009  in a 0–0 home draw against
Juan Aurich.

International career 
He played for the Peru national football team in 2009.

References

External links
 
 
 

1989 births
Living people
People from Arequipa Province
Association football midfielders
Peruvian footballers
Peru international footballers
Atlético Universidad footballers
Total Chalaco footballers
Club Alianza Lima footballers
Club Deportivo Universidad de San Martín de Porres players
FBC Melgar footballers
Peruvian Primera División players
Peruvian Segunda División players
2015 Copa América players